Samyda glabrata is a species of plant in the Salicaceae family. It is endemic to Jamaica.  It is threatened by habitat loss.

References

glabrata
Vulnerable plants
Endemic flora of Jamaica
Taxonomy articles created by Polbot
Taxa named by Olof Swartz